The Speaker is the presiding officer of the Legislative Assembly of Montserrat. The Speaker is elected by MPs, and does not have to be an Assembly member. There is also a Deputy Speaker, who is elected by MPs from amongst their own numbers, although they cannot also be a member of the cabinet.

List of speakers

References

Politics of Montserrat
Montserrat
Montserrat-related lists